LoadRunner is a software testing tool from OpenText.  It is used to test applications, measuring system behavior and performance under load.  

LoadRunner can simulate millions of users concurrently using application software, recording and later analyzing the performance of key components of the application whilst under load.  

LoadRunner simulates user activity by generating messages between application components or by simulating interactions with the user interface such as key presses or mouse movements. The messages and interactions to be generated are stored in scripts. LoadRunner can generate the scripts by recording them, such as logging HTTP requests between a client web browser and an application's web server.  

Hewlett Packard Enterprise acquired LoadRunner as part of its acquisition of Mercury Interactive in November 2006. In Sept 2016, Hewlett Packard Enterprise announced it is selling its software business, including Mercury products, to Micro Focus. As of 01-Sept-2017, the acquisition was complete.

On Dec 12, 2019, Micro Focus announced newer names for LoadRunner package and started following CalVer. 

 LoadRunner is now LoadRunner Professional 2020
 Performance Center is now LoadRunner Enterprise 2020
 StormRunner Load is now LoadRunner Cloud 2020

Architecture
The key components of LoadRunner are:

 Load Generator generates the load against the application by following scripts
 VuGen (Virtual User Generator) for generating and editing scripts
 Controller controls, launches and sequences instances of Load Generator - specifying which script to use, for how long etc. During runs the Controller receives real-time monitoring data and displays status.
 Agent process manages connection between Controller and Load Generator instances. 
 Analysis assembles logs from various load generators and formats reports for visualization of run result data and monitoring data.

Modules are available to enable LoadRunner to capture, replay and script different application and networking technologies. These include support for:

 applications using Microsoft .NET and Java
 database servers such as Microsoft SQL Server and Oracle
 internetworking protocols such as DNS, FTP and LDAP
 e-mail protocols including IMAP, MAPI, POP3 & SMTP 
 remote client technologies such as Citrix ICA and RDP.

LoadRunner can be run standalone or multiple instances can pooled for use by several people under the control of LoadRunner Enterprise, formerly known as HP PerformanceCenter.

History

Scripting Languages
LoadRunner client emulation scripts are usually created using the ANSI C programming language. However, Java and .Net programs can also be run by LoadRunner.  Version 12.50 added the use of JavaScript for Web-HTTP/HTML scripts.

Scripts from other testing tools such as Apache JMeter, Gatling, NUnit, and Selenium can be run by LoadRunner by declaring an interface library. This enables scripts to send key-value pairs to the Controller as the script runs, enabling response times to be associated with specific conditions such as the number of items displayed in the User Interface.

LoadRunner scripts can also be called from within Jenkins.

Support for JMeter Tests 
LoadRunner 12.55 enables testers to run Apache JMeter scripts from Controller, alongside Vuser scripts can view the results to LoadRunner measurements. This feature is provided as beta version.

References

External links
LoadRunner Product Page

Load testing tools
Micro Focus International